The 1804–1813 Russo-Persian War was one of the many wars between the Persian Empire and Imperial Russia, and began like many of their wars as a territorial dispute. The new Persian king, Fath Ali Shah Qajar, wanted to consolidate the northernmost reaches of his kingdom—modern-day Georgia—which had been annexed by Tsar Paul I several years after the Russo-Persian War of 1796. Like his Persian counterpart, the Tsar Alexander I was also new to the throne and equally determined to control the disputed territories.

The war ended in 1813 with the Treaty of Gulistan which ceded the previously disputed territory of Georgia to Imperial Russia, and also the Iranian territories of Dagestan, most of what is nowadays Azerbaijan, and minor parts of Armenia.

Origins

The origins of the first full scale Russo-Persian War can be traced back to the decision of Tsar Paul to annex Georgia (December 1800) after Erekle II, who had been appointed as ruler of Kartli several years earlier by his ruler Nader Shah, made a plea to Christian Russia in the Treaty of Georgievsk of 1783 to be incorporated into the empire. After Paul's assassination (11 March 1801), the activist policy was continued by his son, Tsar Alexander, aimed at establishing Russian control over the khanates of the eastern Caucasus. In 1803, the newly appointed commander of Russian forces in the Caucasus, Paul Tsitsianov, attacked Ganja and captured its citadel on 15 January 1804. Ganja's governor, Javad Khan Qajar, was killed, and a large number of the inhabitants slaughtered. The Qajar ruler, Fath Ali Shah, saw the Russian threat to Armenia, Karabagh, and Azerbaijan not only as a source of instability on his northwestern frontier but as a direct challenge to Qajar authority.

Unequal forces

The Russians were unable to commit a large portion of their troops to the Caucasus region, because Alexander's attention was continually distracted by simultaneous wars with France, the Ottoman Empire, Sweden and Great Britain. Therefore, the Russians were forced to rely on superior technology, training, and strategy in the face of an overwhelming disparity in numbers. Some estimates put the Persian numerical advantage at five to one. Shah Fath Ali's heir, Abbas Mirza, tried to modernize the Persian army, seeking help from French experts through the Franco-Persian alliance, and then from British experts, in order to address the tactical disparity between the forces.

Outbreak of war
The war began when Russian commanders Ivan Gudovich and Paul Tsitsianov attacked the Persian settlement of Echmiadzin, the holiest town in Armenia. Gudovich, unsuccessful in the siege of Echmiadzin due to a lack of troops, withdrew to Yerevan, where his siege again failed. Despite these ineffective forays, the Russians held the advantage for the majority of the war, due to superior troops and strategy. Russia's inability, however, to dedicate anything more than 10,000 troops to the campaign allowed the Persians to mount a fairly respectable resistance effort. The Persian troops were of a low grade, mostly irregular cavalry.

Holy war and Persian defeat
The Persians scaled up their efforts late in the war, declaring jihad, or holy war, on Imperial Russia in 1810. Russia's superior technology and tactics ensured a series of strategic victories. Despite the Persian alliance with Napoleon, who was the ally of Persia's Abbas Mirza, France could provide little concrete direct help. Even when the French were in occupation of Moscow, Russian forces in the south were not recalled but continued their offensive against Persia, culminating in Pyotr Kotlyarevsky's victories at Aslanduz and Lenkoran, after the setback in the Battle of Sultanabad, in 1812 and 1813 respectively. Upon the Persian surrender, the terms of the Treaty of Gulistan ceded the vast majority of the previously disputed territories to Imperial Russia. This led to the region's once-powerful khans being decimated and forced to pay homage to Russia.

War

During this period Russia was mainly dealing with the local khanates which were subject to Persia. Following the bloody capture of Ganja the khans could usually be bullied without too much fighting. The main Persian army intervened twice, once successfully and once unsuccessfully. Significant events include the 1804 capture of Ganja and failure to take Yerevan; the 1805 push east, almost to the Caspian; and the 1806 death of Tsitsianov, capture of the Caspian coast, and start of the Russo-Turkish War.

In late 1803 Pavel Tsitsianov demanded the submission of the Ganja Khanate southeast of Georgia, over which Georgia had some nominal claims. He was now no longer unifying Georgia or liberating Christians but moving against territory that was traditionally seen as Muslim and Persian. On 3 January 1804 Ganja was taken with significant slaughter. Abbas Mirza's army arrived too late and retired south. In June, Tsitsianov and 3,000 men marched south toward Echmiadzin in the Yerevan Khanate. They were driven back by Abbas Mirza and 18,000 Persians (?). The Russians then moved east and besieged Yerevan (July–September). The local khan held the citadel, the Russians held the town, and the Persians held the surrounding countryside. Weakened by disease and fighting on half-rations, the Russians withdrew to Georgia, losing more men along the way.

In early 1805 the Shuragel Sultanate was taken by the Russians. This was a small area at the junction of Georgia, the Yerevan Khanate, and Turkey and included the militarily important town of Gyumri. On 14 May, the Karabakh Khanate submitted to the Russians, and on 21 May the Shaki Khanate did the same. In response to the loss of Karabakh, Abbas Mirza occupied the Askeran Fortress at the mouth of a valley leading from the plain southwest to Shusha, the capital of Karabakh. The Russians responded by sending Koryagin to take the castle of Shahbulag. Abbas Mirza marched north and besieged the place. On hearing of the approach of another army under Fath Ali, Koryagin slipped out at night and headed for Shusha. He was caught at the Askeran gorge but not defeated. More Russian troops relieved the blockade of Koryagin and Shusha. Seeing that the main Russian force had pushed far to the southeast, Abbas Mirza made a wide swing north and besieged Ganja. On 27 July, 600 Russian infantry routed his camp at Shamkir.

In September, a naval attack on Baku failed. In November, Tsitsianov marched east toward Baku, en route to accepting the submission of the Shirvan Khanate (27 December). On 8 February 1806, he was murdered while accepting the surrender of Baku. Russian honor was restored by Glazenap, who marched from north of the mountains and took Derbent, Quba, and Baku (technically Baku surrendered to Bulgakov). Gudovich replaced Tsitsianov as Viceroy. In December, Turkey declared war on Russia.

Troops were moved west to deal with the Turks, a truce was made and Nibolshin was left to guard the frontier. Fighting resumed in 1808 when Russia took Echmiadzrin. Abbas Mirza was defeated south of Lake Shirvan; as a result, Nakhichevan, or some part of it, was occupied. In September 1808, Gudovich attacked Yerevan. The assault failed, withdrawal became necessary and 1,000 men, mostly sick and wounded, froze to death on the retreat. Escape was only possible because Nibolshin and Lissanevich defeated a "vast horde" of Persians. Gudovich resigned and was replaced by Alexander Tormasov. In 1809, Fath Ali was driven back from Gyumri and Abbas Mirza from Ganja. In 1810 Abbas Mirza tried to invade Karabakh but was defeated at Meghri on the Aras River.

In early 1812, Persia invaded Karabagh. They occupied Shahbulag Castle, which the Russians later recaptured. They attacked a Russian battalion at "Sultan-Buda" using European-style infantry and a few British officers. After a day of fighting the Russians surrendered. Russia responded to this unusual defeat by moving Pyotr Kotlyarevsky, the hero of Akhalkalaki, from the Turkish to the Persian front.

In the summer of 1812, just as Napoleon was preparing to invade Russia, the Russians made peace with Turkey and Russian troops in Caucasia turned to Persia. On 19 October, Kotlyarevsky ignored the cautious Ritishchev's orders, crossed the Aras River and routed the Persians at the Battle of Aslanduz. He then crossed the snow-covered Mughan Plain and, after a five-day siege, stormed the newly-built fort of Lankaran. The Russians lost 1000 men, two-thirds of their force. Of the 4000-man Persian garrison, every survivor was bayonetted. Kotlyarevsky was found wounded among a heap of corpses. He was carried half-dead to Tiflis (now Tbilisi) and survived for 39 more years, unfit for further service. A victory at "Karabezouk" completed the discomfiture of the Persians (3 April 1813). News of Napoleon's defeat reached Persia in the spring of 1813. Peace negotiations were already underway and an armistice was made in October. In the Treaty of Gulistan, Persia recognized Russian possession of all the Khanates it held and gave up all pretensions to Dagestan and Georgia. The border in the northern part of Talysh was left for later decision. Persia kept Meghri in southwest Karabakh, which the Russians had abandoned as unhealthy and inaccessible from the rest of Karabakh.

Thirteen years later, in another Russo-Persian War fought from 1826 to 1828, Persia tried to regain its territory. It was defeated and lost the Khanates of Yerevan and Nakhichevan, roughly corresponding to modern Armenia.

Anglo-French diplomacy in Persia

Although this Russo-Persian War was in many respects a continuation of a struggle for supremacy in Transcaucasia dating back to the time of Peter the Great and Nader Shah, it differed from earlier conflicts between Persia and Russia in that its course came to be affected as much by the diplomatic maneuvering of European powers during the Napoleonic era as by developments on the battlefield. Following the Russian occupation of the various khanates, Fath Ali Shah, strapped for cash and anxious to find an ally, had made a request for British support as early as December 1804. In 1805, however, Russia and Britain allied in the Third Coalition against France, which meant that Britain was not in a position to cultivate its Persian connection at Russian expense and felt it necessary to evade repeated requests from the shah for assistance. As the British ambassador to the Ottoman Empire, Charles Arbuthnot, put it in August 1806, To please the Emperor [of Russia], we have thrown away all our influence in Persia This opened the door for France to use Persia to threaten both Russian and British interests. Hoping to forge a tripartite alliance of France, the Ottoman Empire, and Persia, Napoleon sent various envoys to Persia, notably Pierre Jaubert and Claude Mathieu de Gardane, whose diplomatic efforts culminated in the Treaty of Finckenstein, signed on 4 May 1807, under which France recognized Persian claims to Georgia and promised assistance in training and equipping the Persian army. Only two months later, however, Napoleon and Alexander I agreed to an armistice and signed the Treaty of Tilsit (7 July 1807), which effectively rendered the French commitments to Persia untenable, although the French mission did continue to provide some military assistance and tried to mediate a settlement with Russia. The French efforts failed, prompting Gudovich to resume the siege of Erevan in 1808.

The rise of French influence in Persia, viewed as the prelude to an attack on India, had greatly alarmed the British, and the Franco-Russian rapprochement at Tilsit conveniently provided an opportunity for a now isolated Britain to resume its efforts in Persia, as reflected in the subsequent missions of John Malcolm (1807–8) and Harford Jones (1809). According to the preliminary treaty of Tehran arranged by Jones (15 March 1809), Britain agreed to train and equip 16,000 Persian infantry and pay a subsidy of £100,000 should Persia be invaded by a European power, or to mediate if that power should be at peace with Great Britain. Although Russia had been making peace overtures, and Jones had hoped the preliminary agreement would encourage a settlement, these developments strengthened Fath Ali Shah 's determination to continue the war. Anglo-Persian relations warmed even further with the visit of Abu’l-Hasan Khan to London in 1809 and his return to Persia with Gore Ouseley as ambassador and minister plenipotentiary in 1810. Under Ouseley's auspices, the preliminary treaty was converted into the Definitive Treaty of Friendship and Alliance in 1812, which confirmed the earlier promises of military assistance and increased the amount of the subsidy for that purpose to £150,000 .

Then, in the third and final twist to this story, Napoleon invaded Russia in June 1812, making Russia and Britain allies once again. Britain, like France after Tilsit, was thus obliged to steer a course between antagonizing Russia and violating its commitments to Persia, with its best option being to broker a settlement of the conflict between the two. The Russians had been periodically interested in finding a negotiated settlement since the setbacks of 1805–6 and as recently as 1810, when Alexander Tormasov, who had replaced Gudovich as commander after his unsuccessful siege of Erevan, and Mirza Bozorg Qaem-magham had sought to arrange an armistice . Yet the Russians were unwilling to make serious concessions in order to end the war, and the Persians were also less than eager to settle since from their point of view the war was not going all that badly. Ouseley, however, realized the awkwardness of having Britain's resources deployed against its Russian ally and that the situation for Persia was likely to worsen once Russia was freed from the struggle with Napoleon. He was thus receptive to Russian requests to act as an intermediary and sought ways to pressure the Qajars into accepting a settlement. He proposed revisions to the Definitive Treaty, scaled back British military involvement (leaving two officers, Charles Christie and Lindesay Bethune, and some drill sergeants with the Persian army), and threatened to withhold payment of the subsidy promised to the Qajars .

In February 1812, N. R. Ritischev assumed command of the Russian forces and opened peace negotiations with the Persians. Ouseley and his representative at the talks, James Morier, acted as intermediaries and made various proposals to Rtischev, but they were not accepted . In August, Abbas Mirza resumed hostilities and captured Lankaran. After news arrived that Napoleon had occupied Moscow, the negotiations were suspended (Ramażān 1227/September 1812). Then, on 24 Shawwal 1227/31 October 1812, while Ritischev was away in Tbilisi, the general Peter Kotliarevski launched a surprise night attack on the Persian encampment at Aslanduz, which resulted in the complete rout of the army of Abbas Mirza and the death of one of the British supporting officers (Christie). As it also became increasingly apparent that Napoleon's offensive in Russia had failed disastrously, the Russians were emboldened to pursue a more aggressive campaign in the Caucasus. In early 1813, the Persian fortress at Lankarān fell and its garrison was annihilated, enabling the Russians to occupy most of Talesh again . Although Fath Ali Shah and Abbas Mirza wanted to fight on after these setbacks, they eventually had to yield to Ouseley, who assured the Shah that either the Russians would make territorial concessions or the British would continue the subsidy they had promised.

1813: Treaty of Gulistan
Russia fought on two frontiers: against the Ottomans between 1806 and 1812; and against the Persians from 1804 to 1813. Both frontiers were concluded via treaties: the treaty of Bucharest in 1812 with the Ottoman Empire; and the treaty of Gulistan in 1813 that lasted until 1826 when Russian troops, acting outside of the control of Tsar Nicholas I, occupied Mirak. Under the Gulistan treaty, Russia was acknowledged as the power in control of the South Caucasus; western and eastern Georgia and the Muslim khanates until Baku and Quba were placed under Russian administration.

Assessment and aftermath

Although Russia was recognized as a power over the Caucasus, the success of Treaty of Gulistan was overshadowed by the threat of the Ottomans. The Treaty of Bucharest was in favor of the Ottoman Empire which had claimed the territories that Russia conquered during the war: Poti and Anapa, Black Sea port cities as well as Akhalkalaki. Still, the conditions of sovereignty were comparatively stable in these years. In the complex political map of the South Caucasus, Russia had the means to control the region through defensive lines.

According to Prof. William Bayne Fisher (et al.):

See also
 Russo-Persian War (1826-1828)
 Khanates of the Caucasus

References
Muriel Aiken, Russia and Iran, 1780–1828, 1980

Literature
N. Dubrovin. История войны и владычества русских на Кавказе, volumes 4–6. SPb, 1886–88.

Further reading
 

Conflicts in 1804
Conflicts in 1805
Conflicts in 1806
Conflicts in 1807
Conflicts in 1808
Conflicts in 1809
Conflicts in 1810
Conflicts in 1811
Conflicts in 1812
Conflicts in 1813
1804 in the Russian Empire
1813 in the Russian Empire
1804 in Iran
1813 in Iran
19th century in Azerbaijan
19th century in Georgia (country)
19th-century military history of the Russian Empire
History of Dagestan
History of the Caspian Sea
Invasions by Russia
Invasions of Iran
Khanates of the South Caucasus
Khanates of the North Caucasus
Military history of Azerbaijan
Military history of Georgia (country)
Military history of Iran
Russo-Persian Wars
Napoleonic Wars
Wars involving Qajar Iran